Samuele Ceccarelli (born 9 January 2000) is an Italian sprinter. 

He won the 2023 Italian indoor championships and the 2023 European Athletics Indoor Championships, both defeating the Olympic champion Marcell Jacobs over 60 m.

Career
Ceccarelli won a national championship at senior level during his career.

Achievements

National titles
 Italian Athletics Indoor Championships
 60 metres: 2023

See also
 Italian national track relay team

Notes

References

External links
 

2000 births
Living people
Italian male sprinters
21st-century Italian people